The 1985 NCAA Division II Soccer Championship was the 14th annual tournament held by the NCAA to determine the top men's Division II college soccer program in the United States.

In a rematch of the previous year's final, Seattle Pacific defeated defending champions Florida International, 3–2, to win their third Division II national title. The Falcons (20-3) were coached by Cliff McCrath.

The final match was played on December 7 at Florida International University in Miami, Florida.

Bracket

Final

See also  
 NCAA Division I Men's Soccer Championship
 NCAA Division III Men's Soccer Championship
 NAIA Men's Soccer Championship

References 

NCAA Division II Men's Soccer Championship
NCAA Division II Men's Soccer Championship
NCAA Division II Men's Soccer Championship
NCAA Division II Men's Soccer Championship
Soccer in Florida